Warden is an unincorporated community in Richland Parish, Louisiana, United States. The community is located   N of Delhi, Louisiana.

Name origin
The community was once named Richland but in 1929 Mary Southall, the local postmaster at that time, changed the name to Warden using the surname of a local resident. The name of the community was changed because mail was mistakenly being sent to another town called Richland.

References

Unincorporated communities in Richland Parish, Louisiana
Unincorporated communities in Louisiana